Tunisia competed at the 2000 Summer Olympics in Sydney, Australia. 47 competitors, 40 men and 7 women, took part in 34 events in 10 sports.

Athletics

Men
Track and road events

Field events

Women
Track and road events

Field events

Boxing

Men

Fencing

One male fencer represented Tunisia in 2000.
Men

Handball

Preliminary round
 Ali Madi
 Anouar Ayed
 Dhaker Seboui
 Haikel Meguennem
 Issam Tej
 Makrem Jerou
 Mohamed Madi
 Mohamed Messaoudi
 Mohamed Riadh Sanaa
 Oualid Ben Amor
 Ouissem Bousnina
 Ouissem Hmam
 Slim Zehani
 Sobhi Sioud

Group B

9th / 10th place

Judo

Men

Women

Rowing

Tunisian rowers qualified the following boats:
Men

Women

Qualification Legend: FA=Final A (medal); FB=Final B (non-medal); FC=Final C (non-medal); FD=Final D (non-medal); FE=Final E (non-medal); FF=Final F (non-medal); SA/B=Semifinals A/B; SC/D=Semifinals C/D; SE/F=Semifinals E/F; R=Repechage

Swimming

Men

Table tennis

Weightlifting

Men

Wrestling

Men's Greco-Roman

References

External links
Official Olympic Reports

Nations at the 2000 Summer Olympics
2000
O